Yitian station is a station of Shenzhen Metro Line 3. It opened on 28 June 2011. This station served as the terminus of the line until the extension to Futian Bonded Area on 28 October 2020.

Station layout

Exits

References

Railway stations in Guangdong
Shenzhen Metro stations
Futian District
Railway stations in China opened in 2011